The Compulsory dance (CD) is a segment of artistic roller skating competitions in which all the couples or solo dancers perform the same standardized steps and holds to music of a specified tempo and genre.  Compulsory dances were abolished for Junior/Senior level international roller skating competitions in the 2018 season, and a new section called the Style Dance was introduced from the 2015/16 season alongside the standard compulsory dances and freedance categories. The style dance is very similar in structure to the short dance in Figure skating, and from 2018 was one of 2 segments in international roller dance competition, with the freedance.

The patterns for most dances either cover one-half or one full circuit of the rink. The World Skate Artistic Technical Committee (formerly the Fédération Internationale de Roller Sports (FIRS)) publish the step diagrams and descriptions of the dances that are competed internationally, and also provide a set of standard music recordings for each dance with uniform tempo and introductory phrasing for use in competition.

Dances 
The dances that are performed in junior and senior international competition include:

 14 Step Plus
 Argentine Tango
 Blues
 Castel March
 Flirtation Waltz
 Fourteen Step
 Fourteen Step Plus
 Golden Samba
 Harris Tango
 Iceland Tango
 Italian Foxtrot
 Kilian
 Midnight Blues
 Paso Doble
 Quickstep
 Rocker Foxtrot
 Shaken Samba
 Starlight Waltz
 Tango Delancha
 Tango Delanco
 Terenzi Waltz
 Westminster Waltz
 Viennese Waltz

Artistic roller skating in the United States and the United Kingdom also has competitive divisions of team and solo dance for all ages and skill levels that compete at the local, regional, and national levels. At competitions, skaters perform between two and six dances set to organ music for a maximum of 3 minutes per dance. Skaters are judged on a number of things that include technique, pattern placement, timing and overall performance.

Starting from the 2015/16 season the Style Dance was introduced and is regarded similarly to the short dance in Ice Dance. Dances marked with an asterisk* in the table below are the required dance from the style dance in the given season. From the 2017-18 season, only the Style Dance and Freedance will be skated in Junior / Senior international competition. Compulsory Dances will still be used for younger age categories internationally and also in national competitions.

By season

References

Artistic roller skating